Sarburma, also known simply as  among Crimean Tatars and as pierekaczewnik among Lipka Tatars, is a traditional meat pie in Crimean Tatar cuisine. In Crimean Tatar language  means "to wrap" and  "to curl". Its name among Lipka Tatars come from the Russian verb   “to roll up.” Nowadays, it is a widespread snack in Crimea, neighbouring regions of Ukraine, and in Turkey. In Poland it is a distinctive cuisine of the Lipka Tatars, and is registered under the name pierekaczewnik in the European Union and United Kingdom as a Traditional Speciality Guaranteed. The main ingredients are traditionally lamb and dough. The same are used in another very popular Crimean and Turkish dish, .

See also
 Börek

References

Crimean cuisine
Tatar cuisine
Turkish cuisine
Ukrainian cuisine
Polish cuisine
Savoury pies
Lamb dishes